Bala Ərəblər (known as Güloğlular until 2000) is a village and municipality in the Barda Rayon of Azerbaijan.  It has a population of 941.

References 

Populated places in Barda District